Ian Hansen (born 1958) is a Falkland Islander farmer and politician who has served as a Member of the Legislative Assembly for the Camp constituency since winning an uncontested by-election in 2011 which filled the seat vacated by Bill Luxton. Hansen had already served on the Legislative Assembly from 2003 until 2009. He was initially elected as a member of the Legislative Council, which was reconstituted into the Legislative Assembly with the implementation of the 2009 Constitution.

From 1974–1980, Hansen worked as a shepherd at Hill Cove before moving to work on Pebble Island as a stockman. He was a founding member of the Falkland Islands Farmers Association and was chairman of the Rural Business Association from 2000 until 2003.

In 2003, Hansen joined the Legislative Council as a member for Camp after winning a by-election to fill the seat left vacant by Philip Miller. He lost his seat in the 2009 general election. Hansen returned to the Legislative Assembly in 2011 after being the only candidate in a by-election to fill the seat vacated by Bill Luxton. He won re-election in 2013 and 2017.

References

1958 births
Living people
Falkland Islands farmers
Falkland Islands Councillors 2001–2005
Falkland Islands Councillors 2005–2009
Falkland Islands MLAs 2009–2013
Falkland Islands MLAs 2013–2017
Falkland Islands MLAs 2017–2021
Falkland Islands MLAs 2021–2025